The Men's snowboard slopestyle competition at the FIS Freestyle Ski and Snowboarding World Championships 2019 was held on February 9 and 10, 2019.

The final was cancelled due to weather conditions and the qualification results were used to determine the final ranking.

Qualification
The qualification was started on February 9, at 09:00. The three best snowboarders from each heat qualified to the final and the next five best snowboarders of each heat qualified for the semifinal.

Heat 1

Heat 2

Semifinal
The qualification was started on February 9, at 12:10. The best four snowboarder qualifies for the final.

Final

References

Men's snowboard slopestyle